Forsythe Charles Clowdsley (February 6, 1895 – September 26, 1940) was a United States Democratic politician, serving in the California State Assembly.

Clowdsley was born in California. During World War I he served in the United States Army.

Clowdsley served in the California State Assembly from 1927 to 1935, and was Speaker of the California State Assembly in 1934. He was San Joaquin County District Attorney during the Stockton Cannery Strike of 1937.

References

United States Army personnel of World War I
1895 births
1940 deaths
20th-century American politicians
Democratic Party members of the California State Assembly